Yogva is a rural locality (a selo) and the administrative center of Yorgvinskoye Rural Settlement, Kudymkarsky District, Perm Krai, Russia. The population was 760 as of 2010. There are 30  streets.

Geography 
Yogva is located on the Yegva River, 13 km northeast of Kudymkar (the district's administrative centre) by road. Samchikova is the nearest rural locality.

References 

Rural localities in Kudymkarsky District